Richard Pryor: I Ain't Dead Yet, #*%$#@!! is a 2003 American short documentary film about and featuring comedian Richard Pryor. It was produced and aired by Comedy Central. It features commentary from different actors, comedians, and Pryor's own family members on the aspects and influence of his life and work.

The film was released just over two years before Pryor's death in 2005. It was played multiple times on Comedy Central and later re-edited and broadcast after his death.

External links 
 

American documentary television films
Comedy Central original programming
Documentary films about comedy and comedians
Documentary films about entertainers
Richard Pryor
2000s English-language films
2000s American films